Zinc finger protein basonuclin-1 is a protein that in humans is encoded by the BNC1 gene.

The protein encoded by this gene is a zinc finger protein present in the basal cell layer of the epidermis and in hair follicles. It is also found in abundance in the germ cells of testis and ovary. This protein is thought to play a regulatory role in keratinocyte proliferation and it may also be a regulator for rRNA transcription. This gene seems to have multiple alternatively spliced transcript variants, but their full-length nature is not known yet. There seems to be evidence of multiple polyadenylation sites for this gene.

BNC1 or Basonuclin 1 does not interact with PICK1. The suggestion that it does is based on the article that proved that PICK1 interacts with the non-voltage gated sodium channels BNC1 (brain Na+ channel 1). Both Basonuclin 1 and brain Na+ channel 1 have the same abbreviation BNC1, but they are not similar proteins and PICK1 interacts with the second protein, not the first one.

References

Further reading

External links